The Raeburn Shield is a hypothetical rugby union trophy. The women's rugby union version is the Utrecht Shield. 
The trophy is named after Raeburn Place the site of the first ever international between England and Scotland, on 27 March 1871.
The concept is that it is a Title Holders Shield, similar to a Boxing World Title or the Ranfurly Shield in New Zealand.

The proposed advantages are:

 As it would be decided on a single game, there would be increased chances of producing a Title Holder from a non Top Tier nation, giving more chance for an underdog to win a title. For example, Romania has held the title despite never reaching the Rugby World Cup knockout stages.
 Title games would become more interesting, as the title holder would have something to play for, and the underdog would have extra motivation to lift their game.  For example, Munster still are proud about beating the All Blacks in 1978, even after winning the Heineken cup multiple times.
 These Title games  would occur much more frequently than the World Cup.  For example, in 1999 Rugby World Cup, the sequence of Raeburn Shield holders was Wales, Samoa, Scotland, New Zealand, France, Australia.  However, after the World Cup, the Raeburn Shield was quickly challenged.  In 2000 Australia defended the shield 4 times, before yielding it to NZ in July.  NZ defended it 2 times before yielding it to England who defended it 10 times before yielding it to Ireland, who then yielded it to Japan.

List of shield holders

Most shield defences

Notes

  Excludes two wins and one loss against the British & Irish Lions in 1910.
   Due to World War 1, South Africa played no tests from 1914 until 1921.
  Excludes three wins and one draw against the British & Irish Lions in 1924. 
 Excludes one win against the British & Irish Lions in 1930 and one win against the Māori All Blacks in 1931.
  Excludes two wins and one loss against the British & Irish Lions in 1938.
  Due to World War 2, South Africa played no tests from 1939 until 1949.
  Excludes two wins and two losses against the British & Irish Lions in 1955.
  Excludes three wins and one loss against the British & Irish Lions in 1959.
  Excludes three wins and one draw against the British & Irish Lions in 1962.
  Excludes one draw against the Presidents XV in 1974.
  Excludes one win against the World XV in 1977, four wins against the South American XV in 1980 and three wins and one loss against the British & Irish Lions, also in 1980.
  Excludes four wins against the British & Irish Lions in 1983.
  Includes one win against the now-defunct Soviet Union team (which is now Georgia and Russia, among others) in 1985.
  Excludes two wins and one loss against the British & Irish Lions in 1993.
  Excludes two losses and one win against the British & Irish Lions in 1997.
  Excludes one win against the Pacific Islanders in 2004.
  Excludes one win, one loss and one draw against the British & Irish Lions in 2017. 
  After the 2019 Rugby World Cup, South Africa did not play a match until 2021. This was due to complications faced with preparation and travel as a result of the COVID-19 pandemic.

See also
 List of rugby union competitions

References
 ESPN Scrum article on the Raeburn Shield 
 Raeburn Shield web site 

Rugby union trophies and awards